Soak Creek is an unincorporated community in Raleigh County, West Virginia, United States.

The community takes its name from nearby Soak Creek, which originally was called Soak Ass Creek.

References

Unincorporated communities in West Virginia
Unincorporated communities in Raleigh County, West Virginia